Jibril Blessing (born 15 April 1988), professionally known as J Blessing or jblessing, is a Kenyan cinematographer and music video and television producer and director. He is the cinematographer and director of the TV comedy series The Churchill Show.

Early life and education
Blessing grew up in the suburbs of Komarock Phase 2, near Zone 3 and started out as a dancer. He studied at the Los Angeles Film School in California.

Career 
After working as a freelance video director and producer, Blessing founded Link Video Global, a production company based in Nairobi. He also owns Digitone Agency and is co-founder and CEO of Keep Pace Africa. Musicians and producers who credit him for starting their careers include Willy Paul and music video producer Young Wallace.

Blessing is the longest-serving video producer on The Churchill Show.  he was also developing new shows for the production company, Laugh Industry.

Personal life
Until 2017, Blessing was in a long-term relationship with Chantelle, with whom he had a son, who died young. Since 2018, he has been rumored to be in a relationship with singer Avril and to have fathered a child by her, but he introduced a different woman as his girlfriend in November 2018. He is the father of singer Laika's first child.

Awards and nominations 

|-
| ?
| Video Director of The Year
| Mwafaka Awards
| 
|-
| 2011
| Best Video Director
| Groove Awards
| 
|-
| 2011
| Best Video Director
| Mwafaka Awards
| 
|-
| 2012
| Best Video Director
| Groove Awards
| 
|-
| 2013
| Best Video Director
| Mwafaka Awards
| 
|-
| 2014
| Best Video Director
| Mwafaka Awards
| 
|-
| 2014
| Best Video Director
| Uganda's VIGA Awards
| 
|}

Videography

References

External links
Official website

1988 births
Living people
Cinematographers
Kenyan filmmakers
Music video directors
Television producers